Impiö is a Finnish surname. Notable people with the surname include:

 Lauri Impiö (1929–2006), Finnish Lutheran clergyman and politician
 Taina Impiö (born 1956), Finnish cross country skier

Finnish-language surnames
Surnames of Finnish origin